Üsküp is a belde (town) in Kırklareli Province, Turkey

Geography
Üsküp is in the central district (Kırklareli) of the province. It is situated to the east of Kırklaeli at a distance of .The population of Üsküp is  2315 as of 2011.

History 
Üsküp is an old settlement and the name of the town may refer to Scythians, but more likely is a Turkish corruption of the Greek word "Skopos." In 1368, during the reign of Murat I the settlement was annexed to Ottoman Empire. Turkish traveller Evliya Çelebi in the 17th century describes Üsküp as a relatively populated place famous for wine production. Evliya mentions that the hundreds of Muslims of the neighbouring Kırklareli, Vize and Saray towns married with the Greek and Bulgarian girls of Üsküp which were renowned for their beauty and had many children. The Bulgarian inhabitants left the settlement in 1913 while the Greek population stayed until the end of the Turkish War of Independence. According to the Population exchange between Greece and Turkey agreement The Greeks were replaced by the Turks from Greece. The same year the settlement was declared a seat of township. Many of the Greek residents transferred to Greece founded the village of Neos Skopos near Serres, Greece.

Economy 
The town is still known for vineyards and wine production. The best Papaskarasi grapes are produced here. The decomposed granite soils in Üsküp gives different aromas to grapes here.  Other crops are  vegetables and fruits. There are also some small factories around the town.

References

Populated places in Kırklareli Province
Towns in Turkey
Former Greek towns in Turkey
Kırklareli Central District